The 1919–20 Michigan College of Mines Huskies men's ice hockey season was the inaugural season of play for the program.

Season
After World War I college hockey began to expand west from its heartland in New England. Michigan College of Mines was one of two schools in the midwest to begin play in the 1919–20 season (the other being Notre Dame). Due to the lack of collegiate opponents, MCM didn't play any other colleges during their first season, nor did they play any home games as the school did not own or lease any of the local rinks.

Roster

Standings

Schedule and Results

|-
!colspan=12 style=";" | Regular Season

References

Michigan Tech Huskies men's ice hockey seasons
Michigan College of Mines
Michigan College of Mines
Michigan College of Mines
Michigan College of Mines